The 2020 KBO League season, also known by naming rights sponsorship as 2020 Shinhan Bank SOL KBO League, was the 39th season in the history of the KBO League.

Season schedule
The 2020 KBO League season schedule was released in December 2019. Opening Day was originally scheduled on 28 March 2020. Due to the COVID-19 pandemic in South Korea, the Korea Baseball Organization announced in March 2020 that all ten exhibition games would be cancelled, and the start of the season would be delayed until April.

The Kia Tigers, a KBO League team that had arrived in the United States on 30 January 2020 to hold a portion of its spring training activities, remained in their early spring training venue, Terry Park Ballfield in Fort Myers, Florida (United States) through March. Preseason KBO League games began on 21 April. The regular season began on 5 May.

An Chi-hong was the only free agent to move to the Lotte Giants.

Starting with the 2020 season, if a tie exists for the No. 1 seed, and automatic trip to the Korean Series, then the tiebreaker (head to head record) will not be implemented;  instead, a one game playoff system will be used to determine the automatic bye.

Standings

Postseason

Wild Card
The series started with a 1–0 advantage for the fourth-placed team.

Korean Series

League leaders

Foreign hitters

Foreign hitters

See also
2020 in baseball
2020 Major League Baseball season
2020 Nippon Professional Baseball season
2020 Chinese Professional Baseball League season
Impact of the COVID-19 pandemic on baseball

References

KBO League seasons
KBO League season
KBO League season
Korea Baseball Organization League, 2020